Mon Rak Luk Thung (or Magical Love in the Countryside or Wonder of Luk Thung) is a 1970 musical-comedy-romance film directed by Rungsri Tassanapuk and starring Mitr Chaibancha and Petchara Chaowarat. Released on May 15, 1970, the film was a hit, playing in Thai cinemas for six months.

It featured a hit soundtrack with 14 luk thung (Thai country-folk music) songs that rhapsodize rural life in northeast Thailand. The story is about the romance between a peasant man (Mitr), and a young woman (Petchara) from a wealthy family.

The film was remade in 2005, with the English title Sounds from the Field of Love. It was also adapted in a hit 1990s Thai television series.

Synopsis 
In 1970, Clark (Mitr Chaibancha) falls for Thong Kwao (Petchara Chaowarat). Clark promises that if he can sell his rice, he will propose to Thong Kwao.

However, Clark's land gets seized because of his debt to Chom Thong. Thong Kwao is sent to live with her aunt in Bangkok.

Thong Kwao is introduced to Thammarak in hopes that they should marry. Clark wants to come propose, but Thong Kwao's parents want a steep payment for him to do so. As a result of him not being present, Thong Khao agrees to Thammarak’s proposal. However, it is discovered Thammarak already has a wife, Rue.

Thong Kwao is captured and held for ransom. Clark, along with the police, saves her. He acquires gold pieces, which Thong's father and mother finally accept. The couple marries.

Film, TV or theatrical adaptations 
The film was remade in 1982 and 2005, It was also adapted in a hit 1990s Thai TV series.

Monrak luk thung (1970) - starring Mitr Chaibancha and Petchara Chaowarat
Monrak luk thung (1982) - starring Toon Hiranyasap and Umpa Pusit
Monrak luk thung (1995) - TV series starring Saranyoo Wongkrachang
Monrak luk thung (2005) - TV series starring Natthawut Skidjai and Suvanant Kongying
Sounds from the Field of Love (2005) - starring Nanthawat Asirapojanakul and Apaporn Nakornsawan
Monrak luk thung (2010) - TV series starring Tisadee Sahawong and Jittapa Jampatom

References

External links
 Petchara Chaowarat movies at Thai World View

1970 films
Thai-language films
1970 romantic comedy films
1970s musical comedy films
Thai national heritage films
Thai romantic comedy films